Castel may refer to the following places:

in France
Castel is the Occitan word for the Latin Castrum (small caserna military castrum)  and occurs very often in southern France toponyms especially mixed with the adjective nau (which means new written nòu in Occitan).
 , a village and former commune in Picardy, since 1965 part of Moreuil
Belcastel (disambiguation), Great Castle
Castelnaudary, Newcastle of Arry
Castelnau-le-Lez, Newcastle upon Lez
Castelsagrat, Holy castle
Castelsarrasin, Sarracen castle

in Italy
Castel, a short form of castello (castle), is a very common component in Italian place names:

Castel Baronia, in the province of Avellino
Castel Boglione, in the province of Asti
Castel Bolognese, in the province of Ravenna
Castel Campagnano, in the province of Caserta
Castel Castagna, in the province of Teramo
Castel Colonna, in the province of Ancona
Castel Condino, in the province of Trento
Castel d'Aiano, in the province of Bologna
Castel d'Ario, in the province of Mantua
Castel d'Azzano, in the province of Verona
Castel del Giudice, in the province of Isernia
Castel del Monte, in the province of L'Aquila
Castel del Piano, in the province of Grosseto
Castel del Rio, in the province of Bologna
Castel di Casio, in the province of Bologna
Castel di Ieri, in the province of L'Aquila
Castel di Judica, in the province of Catania
Castel di Lama, in the province of Ascoli Piceno
Castel di Lucio, in the province of Messina
Castel di Sangro, in the province of L'Aquila
Castel di Sasso, in the province of Caserta
Castel di Tora, in the province of Rieti
Castel Focognano, in the province of Arezzo
Castel Frentano, in the province of Chieti

Castel Gabbiano, in the province of Cremona
Castel Gandolfo, in the province of Rome
Castel Giorgio, in the province of Terni
Castel Goffredo, in the province of Mantua
Castel Guelfo di Bologna, in the province of Bologna
Castel Madama, in the province of Rome
Castel Maggiore, in the province of Bologna
Castel Mella, in the province of Brescia
Castel Morrone, in the province of Caserta
Castel Ritaldi, in the province of Perugia
Castel Rocchero, in the province of Asti
Castel Rozzone, in the province of Bergamo
Castel Ruggero, in the province of Salerno
Castel San Giorgio, in the province of Salerno
Castel San Giovanni, in the province of Piacenza
Castel San Lorenzo, in the province of Salerno
Castel San Niccolò, in the province of Arezzo
Castel San Pietro Romano, in the province of Rome
Castel San Pietro Terme, in the province of Bologna
Castel San Vincenzo, in the province of Isernia
Castel Sant'Angelo, in the province of Rieti
Castel Sant'Elia, in the province of Viterbo
Castel Viscardo, in the province of Terni
Castel Vittorio, in the province of Imperia
Castel Volturno, in the province of Caserta

in Spain
Castel de Cabra, a town in the province of Teruel, Aragón.

in Guernsey
Castel, Guernsey is one of the parishes of Guernsey

in Canada
Castel Bay, Northwest Territories

in Israel
Castel National Park

Other uses
 Castel Group, a French beverage company

See also 

 Castells, human towers traditionally built during festivals in many places in Catalonia
 Castell (disambiguation) Castell means 'Castle' both in Welsh and Catalan
 Castells (disambiguation) is a Catalan surname, the plural form of Castell (Castle)
 Castle
 Castillo (disambiguation)
 Castel San Pietro (disambiguation)